Harrison is a town in Lincoln County, Wisconsin, United States. The population was 833 at the 2010 census, up from 793 at the 2000 census. The unincorporated communities of Bundy, Harrison, and Jeffris are located in the town.

Geography
Harrison occupies the northeast corner of Lincoln County; it is bordered to the north and east by Oneida County, and the southern part of its eastern border is with Langlade County. The Wisconsin River runs along the northern edge of the town, and the Prairie River, a tributary of the Wisconsin, crosses the southeast corner. The town is full of dozens of small lakes, particularly in the Harrison Hills in the southern part of town.

Demographics
As of the census of 2000, there were 793 people, 314 households, and 243 families residing in the town. The population density was 11.4 people per square mile (4.4/km2). There were 679 housing units at an average density of 9.8 per square mile (3.8/km2). The racial makeup of the town was 98.99% White, 0.50% Asian, and 0.50% from two or more races. Hispanic or Latino of any race were 1.01% of the population.

There were 314 households, out of which 31.5% had children under the age of 18 living with them, 71.7% were married couples living together, 2.2% had a female householder with no husband present, and 22.6% were non-families. 18.2% of all households were made up of individuals, and 8.0% had someone living alone who was 65 years of age or older. The average household size was 2.53 and the average family size was 2.85.

In the town, the population was spread out, with 24.8% under the age of 18, 3.9% from 18 to 24, 28.4% from 25 to 44, 27.2% from 45 to 64, and 15.6% who were 65 years of age or older. The median age was 41 years. For every 100 females, there were 109.8 males. For every 100 females age 18 and over, there were 104.1 males.

The median income for a household in the town was $42,500, and the median income for a family was $50,625. Males had a median income of $40,250 versus $24,861 for females. The per capita income for the town was $19,463. About 4.6% of families and 7.5% of the population were below the poverty line, including 14.3% of those under age 18 and 8.9% of those age 65 or over.

References

External links

Towns in Lincoln County, Wisconsin
Towns in Wisconsin